Danijel Šturm (born 4 January 1999) is a Slovenian footballer who plays as a winger for Aluminij, on loan from Maribor.

Career
After playing in the lower divisions in Slovenia and Switzerland, Šturm joined Slovenian top division club Maribor in the summer of 2021. He made his league debut on 18 July 2021 against Celje, and scored his first goal for Maribor the same month against Urartu in the UEFA Europa Conference League qualifiers.

References

External links
NZS profile 

1999 births
Living people
People from Šempeter pri Gorici
Slovenian footballers
Association football wingers
FC Chiasso players
FC Mendrisio players
NK Maribor players
NK Aluminij players
Slovenian Second League players
Slovenian PrvaLiga players
Slovenian expatriate footballers
Expatriate footballers in Switzerland
Slovenian expatriate sportspeople in Switzerland